Pamela Zöllner (born 15 January 1977) is a German speed skater. She competed in two events at the 2006 Winter Olympics.

References

External links
 

1977 births
Living people
German female speed skaters
Olympic speed skaters of Germany
Speed skaters at the 2006 Winter Olympics
Speed skaters from Berlin